The Jericho 941 is a double-action/single-action semi-automatic pistol developed by Israel Military Industries (now Israel Weapon Industries) introduced in 1990.

It was first imported into the United States in 1990 by K.B.I., Inc. of Harrisburg, Pennsylvania. It was later imported by O.F. Mossberg & Sons and named the Uzi Eagle and by Magnum Research, Inc. as the Baby Eagle until the end of 2008. Some pistols from Magnum Research are marked Desert Eagle Pistol. Despite these names being used in the American market, the Jericho 941 is not related to the IMI Desert Eagle other than its manufacture and design by IMI, and bears only a slight cosmetic resemblance to the larger pistol. From January 2009 until they ceased business in January 2010,  K.B.I., Inc. (which also imported Charles Daly firearms) imported the handgun as the Jericho. Magnum Research, now a division of Kahr Arms, announced a renewed importation of the Jericho.

In December 2014, IWI US, Inc. announced they would begin importing both the steel and polymer versions of the Jericho 941 in early 2015.

Design and features
The original Jericho 941 was modeled on the CZ-75 pistol and built using parts supplied by the Italian arms house Tanfoglio, which had been making their own CZ-75 clones. Using a well-tested design allowed IMI to avoid the teething problems most new pistol designs experience, and subcontracting much of the basic fabrication work to Tanfoglio allowed IMI to quickly put into production a pistol that would have enough Israeli content to satisfy government contract requirements.

While the R-versions of the Jericho 941 feature a combined safety/decocker (the decocking lever also acts as a safety and remains on "safe" when actuated), the decocker version of the CZ-75 (CZ-75BD) features a simple decocker (the pistol is always ready to fire in double-action mode when decocked). The barrel of the CZ-75 is traditionally rifled, while the Jericho 941 features a polygonal barrel, furthermore the Jericho 941 is substantially heavier. These differences translate into substantial differences in the condition in which the gun is carried. Magazines for the CZ-75 and Tanfoglio T95 will function in the Jericho 941.

One innovation by IMI was a new, much "hotter" cartridge, the .41 Action Express (see below) to go along with the Jericho 941. A key feature shared between 9mm and .41 AE is that the AE cartridges have rebated rims which are the same diameter as the less powerful rounds, but the case is wider, providing more capacity and potential for more power. This allows these pairs of calibers to be used in the same firearm with only a change of barrel, recoil spring and magazine.

The .41 AE was less commercially successful than the 10mm, and was soon discontinued. Experience with heavily loaded rounds gave IMI a considerable lead, however, in chambering for the soon-to-be successful .40 S&W and also allowed the Jericho to be designed for the popular .45 ACP. The Jericho 941 design has been modified to include accessory rails on the frame for mounting lasers or flashlights, a feature found on many modern semi-automatic handguns.

Variants

The introduction of the Jericho 941 also introduced a new caliber to the market, the .41 Action Express (or .41 AE), which was developed in 1986. The .41 AE was a rebated rim cartridge designed to use .410-inch (10.25 mm) bullets and duplicate a reduced power police loading of the .41 Magnum. The Jericho originally shipped with two barrels, one for 9×19mm Parabellum and the other for .41 AE. Since the .41 AE was designed with a rebated rim the same dimensions as that of the 9 mm, the extractor and ejector worked equally well for either cartridge.

A later compact version, the Jericho 941, was chambered in .45 ACP or 9 mm.

Initially Jericho pistols used barrels with polygonal rifling, which sometimes produces slightly higher velocity due to better bullet to barrel fit. IWI switched to conventional land and groove rifling from 2005 to 2007.

The Jericho 941 is issued in current service throughout the Israeli Security Forces, but Israel Weapon Industries lost a 1.2 Billion Pesos bid for the Philippine National Police's 60,000 handgun procurement on July 11, 2012.

Israeli Government IMI Jericho 941F's, occasionally available on the US Civilian Surplus Market, are SAO (Single Action Only) versions of the IMI/IWI Jericho 941 models sold new in the US. These pistols can appear with either factory SAO triggers, or trigger/frame modifications performed by Israeli Armorers. The Armorer-modified version can be externally identified by an extra roll-pin added in the frame slightly forward of the trigger-pivot (also a roll-pin). This extra roll-pin prevents the trigger from moving forward to the now non-existent DA position within the trigger-guard. The SAO triggers of the Govt. 941s apply to what is commonly known as the "Israeli Method" of carry, otherwise known as "Condition 3" within the lexicon developed by Jeff Cooper.

Users

: The Chilean Marine Corps has the IWI Jericho 941 RPSL.

 
: Used by army and police.

: Used by Special Forces.
: Used by various police and security forces.

: Manufactured by the Cugir Arms Factory as the Pistol model 2000.

: Used by Army and Marine Corps Military Police Special Duty Team
: since September 2009 produced in Ukraine under the name “Fort-21.03”. Used by Ukrainian police and special forces
: Limited use in the army and police. Manufactured locally at the Z111 Factory.

References

External links

 IWI official webpage
 Modern Firearms: Jericho 941
 Jericho 941 Pictorial

Semi-automatic pistols of Israel
9mm Parabellum semi-automatic pistols
.40 S&W semi-automatic pistols
.41 Action Express semi-automatic pistols
.45 ACP semi-automatic pistols
Weapons and ammunition introduced in 1990